America y Oriente was a short lived political journal that was published in Buenos Aires, Argentina. The journal was founded by Issa Nakhleh in 1952, and the first issue appeared on 20 November 1952. It was an publication of the Arab League in Argentina. The founder, Issa Nakhleh (1915-2003), was a Christian Palestinian (at times representing Muslim Congress) The previous year the conference had been addressed by Issah Nakhleh, who describes himself as "Legal Adviser to the World Muslim Conference" who served as the representative of the Arab League in Argentina. His purpose in establishing the journal was to improve and reinforce Arab–Latin American exchanges about mutual anti-imperialist agendas.

Issa Nakhle also edited America y Oriente which led a systematic anti-Jewish campaign and its glorification of the totalitarian regimes, particularly of the Nazi Germany. The journal folded in 1956 when Nakhle left Argentina.

References

1952 establishments in Argentina
1956 disestablishments in Argentina
Antisemitic publications
Arab League
Defunct magazines published in Argentina
Defunct political magazines
Fascist newspapers and magazines
Magazines established in 1952
Magazines disestablished in 1956
Magazines published in Buenos Aires
Political magazines published in Argentina
Spanish-language magazines
Antisemitism in Argentina
Pan-Arabist media